Heston is a suburban area and part of the Hounslow district in the London Borough of Hounslow. The residential settlement covers a slightly smaller area than its predecessor farming village, 10.8 miles (17.4 km) west south-west of Charing Cross and adjoins the M4 motorway but has no junction with it; Heston also adjoins the Great West Road, a dual carriageway, mostly west of the "Golden Mile" headquarters section of it. Heston was, historically, in  Middlesex.

History
The village of Heston is north of Hounslow, and has been settled since Saxon times. It is first recorded as having a priest in the 7th century, though the present Anglican parish church dates to the 14th century. A charter of Henry II gives the name as Hestune, meaning "enclosed settlement", which is justified by its location in what was the Warren of Staines, between the ancient Roman road to Bath, and the Uxbridge Road to Oxford. Another suggested etymology is Anglo-Saxon Hǣs-tūn = "brushwood farm or settlement".

Before 1229, Heston was part of the parish of Gistleworth (Isleworth) before being taken by Henry III, who subsequently granted it to the Earl of Cornwall. It covered until the late 19th-century creation of Hounslow from outlying parts of two adjoining parishes, . The close association pre-dates the town of Hounslow, when that was simply Hounslow Priory, the two parishes had long been associated: the medieval manor of Isleworth covered all of that parish and this.  After Henry III died in 1316, Heston was owned by the Crown, and later by the wardens of St Giles' Hospital, until it was surrendered to Henry VIII during the Dissolution of the Monasteries. Elizabeth I granted Heston to Sir Thomas Gresham, and, after eating some bread made from locally grown wheat, insisted on a supply for her own personal use.

The separation from Isleworth in the 14th century gave the locals a sense of independence from the inhabitants and feudal lords of Isleworth, with whom they frequently quarrelled. The practice of "beating the bounds" was practised annually when the inhabitants went in procession around the parish boundaries, to show locals the extent of their lands. A contemporary account of such a procession describes an occasion when the parishioners of Heston came across some from Isleworth, and the ensuing "quarrel" saw men from Heston throwing the others across a ditch.

A single board of health for the parishes mentioned was formed in 1875 and a very large civil parish in 1927.  The Great West Road was completed in 1925, forming the southern border with Hounslow and the farming and market garden land around the village was snapped up for industry and housing developments. The southern part of Heston up to the Great West Road, Sutton (also known as 'The Deans'), was previously a small hamlet subsequently built up as part of the suburb; this name appearing in some road names and other local features. A Roman Catholic parish church was also built for Heston in the 20th century.

Heston Aerodrome

Heston Aerodrome was operational between 1929 and 1947. In September 1938, the British Prime Minister, Neville Chamberlain, flew from Heston to Germany three times in two weeks for talks with Adolf Hitler, and he returned to Heston from the Munich Conference with the paper referred to in his later "Peace for our time" speech from 10 Downing Street.

Housing and industrial estates have been built on some of the area that was Heston Aerodrome, and the M4 motorway with its large service area (Heston services) cuts across the former aerodrome site east–west, but a substantial area to the north of the M4 is host to the Airlinks 18-hole golf course. Many of the roads in the area have aviation-related names: Alcock Road (Alcock and Brown), Brabazon Road (Lord Brabazon), Bleriot Road (Louis Blériot), Cobham Road (Sir Alan Cobham), De Havilland Road (Geoffrey de Havilland), Norman Crescent (Nigel Norman), Phoenix Way (Heston Phoenix), Sopwith Road (Thomas Sopwith), Spitfire Way (Supermarine Spitfire), Whittle Road (Frank Whittle), and Wright Road (the Wright brothers).

Schools
There are six primary schools in Heston: Edison Primary School, Berkeley, The Rosary Catholic School, Westbrook Primary, Springwell School, Heston Primary School.
Heston Community School is a secondary school with a sixth form.

Community
There are three active community groups in Heston: Heston Residents Association, formed in 1918, Heston West Big Local, formed in 2015 and Heston Action Group, formed in 2018.

Transport

London Underground
Hounslow West tube station is just within the area's southern boundary and is ( from the village hall). To the East, the nearest underground station is Osterley tube station ( from the village hall)

East–West roads
The A4 Great West Road, having left the historic A315 on the Chiswick–Brentford border, forms the southern border of Heston and then reaches Henlys Roundabout by Hounslow West from which two routes leave. A WNW route passes Heathrow Airport Terminals 1–3 and 5 as the Bath Road and a WSW route, the A30, passes Terminal 4, bypasses Staines and reaches the M25; the remainder is for the most part a minor route to Land's End, Cornwall.

North–South roads
The north–south A312, The Parkway, to the west of Heston leads south to Feltham and Hampton or north to Harrow passing Waggoners' Roundabout (WNW of Henlys Roundabout in Hounslow West), Hayes, Yeading and Northolt.

Three minor roads converge on Heston from the A315 in parts of Hounslow, the A3063, A3005 and B363.  The single road re-divides just north in Norwood Green into a northwest road to Southall (the A3005) and into the A4127 that passes by Hanwell, briefly using the A4020 west before bypassing Dormers Wells, passing Greenford to reach Sudbury, the town immediately to the west of Wembley and North Wembley.

For longer journeys north, the M4 then M25 provide the best routes. For longer journeys south, Hanworth Road in Hounslow leads to the A316 which becomes the M3 motorway.

Nearest places

Notable people
 Oarsman Don Allum (1937–1992), first man to row the Atlantic Ocean in both directions, lived in Heston.
 Guitarist Jimmy Page, of rock band Led Zeppelin, was born in Heston.
 Guitarist Ritchie Blackmore, of rock bands Deep Purple and Rainbow, grew up in Heston.
 Anthony Collins (1676–1729), philosopher friend of John Locke, was born in Heston.
 Composer Ernest John Moeran (1894–1950) was born in Heston.
 Horticulturist Ellen Willmott (1858–1934) was born in Heston.
 Lynwood Palmer (1868–1941) painter of race-horses lived in Heston between 1911 and 1941.
 Motorcycle racer Mike Hailwood had a bachelor flat in Heston, where he kept his high-powered sports cars.
 Actor Sanjeev Bhaskar grew up in a flat above the shops on Vicarage Farm Road.

Gallery

Demography and housing

Heston's ethnic groups in 2011 were:

14.9% White British

7.2% Other White (Not covering Irish and Gypsy)

60.9% Asian

7.2% Black

This is 2011 combined data for Heston's three wards, Heston East, West and Central.

Notes

References

Sherwood, Tim. 1999. Coming in to Land: A Short History of Hounslow, Hanworth and Heston Aerodromes 1911–1946. Heritage Publications (Hounslow Library) 

Areas of London
Districts of the London Borough of Hounslow
Places formerly in Middlesex